The Conquest of Everest is a 1953 British Technicolor documentary film directed by George Lowe about various expeditions to the summit of Mount Everest. It was nominated for an Academy Award for Best Documentary Feature. 

Cameraman Tom Stobart went on the 1953 British Mount Everest Expedition (as did George Lowe), and after the successful second assault Stobart got the descending party to give no indication to those like Hunt and Westmacott waiting in an agony of suspense at Advance Base (Camp IV) that Hillary and Tenzing had succeeded until they were close enough for Stobart to catch the emotion of the moment on film.

Critical reception
The Monthly Film Bulletin wrote "As one expected, this film is good. It has been most skilfully edited and is often intensely moving."

Home media
The Conquest of Everest was released on Region 0 DVD-R by Alpha Video on 28 January 2014.

See also
List of media related to Mount Everest

References

External links

1953 films
1953 documentary films
British documentary films
Mountaineering films
Films about Mount Everest
1950s English-language films
1950s British films